Mangalapuram is a village in Challapalli mandal, located in Krishna district of the Indian state of Andhra Pradesh.

References

Villages in Krishna district